is a 24-episode anime series co-produced by Trigger, A-1 Pictures, and CloverWorks. It was directed by Atsushi Nishigori, with Nishigori and Naotaka Hayashi handling series composition, Masayoshi Tanaka providing the character designs, Shigeto Koyama acting as mechanical designer, Hiroyuki Imaishi serving as action animation director and Asami Tachibana composing the music. The streaming service Crunchyroll internationally simulcast the series, with Aniplus Asia simulcasting the series in Southeast Asia. Service partner Funimation began the dubbed release of the series in February 2018. 

Darling in the Franxx is set in a dystopian future where children are artificially created and indoctrinated solely to defend the remnants of civilization. The story follows a squad of ten pilots, particularly focusing on the partnership between Hiro, a former prodigy, and Zero Two, a hybrid human and elite pilot who aspires to become entirely human.

The opening theme song, titled "Kiss of Death", is sung by Mika Nakashima and produced by Hyde, while the several ending themes, titled  (ep 1-6),  (ep 7), "Beautiful World" (ep 8-12, 14),  (ep 13), "Escape" (ep 16-20), and "Darling" (ep 21-23), are performed by XX:me (read as "Kiss Me"), a unit consisting of the series' main female casts—Haruka Tomatsu (Zero Two), Kana Ichinose (Ichigo), Nanami Yamashita (Miku), Saori Hayami (Kokoro), and Shizuka Ishigami (Ikuno). Crunchyroll is simulcasting the series, while Funimation is streaming it with an English dub. Aniplus Asia is simulcasting the series in South East Asia.


Episodes

Notes

References

External links

  
 
 Crunchyroll's Darling in the Franxx Page

Episodes
Darling in the Franxx